Second Moon is a South Korean ethnic fusion band that has performed in several folk music festivals around the world. It achieved mainstream recognition by creating music for popular television shows like Princess Hours (2006), Love in the Moonlight (2016) and The Legend of the Blue Sea (2016).

Beginnings
Second Moon was founded by commercial and film music producers Kim Hyun-bo and Park Jin-woo in 2004.

Discography

Studio albums

References

K-pop music groups
Musical groups established in 2004
Musical groups from Seoul
South Korean contemporary R&B musical groups
Korean Music Award winners